Lieutenant-General Sir James Charles Dalbiac,  (1776–1847) was a British Army officer and Member of Parliament.

Life
He was born the eldest son of Charles Dalbiac of Hungerford Park, Berkshire.

In 1793 he joined the 4th Light Dragoons as a cornet and was promoted to lieutenant in 1794, captain in 1798, major in 1801, and lieutenant-colonel in 1808. He was posted to Portugal with his regiment in 1808 to act as second lieutenant-colonel to Lord Edward Somerset. In July 1809 he led the left wing of the 4th Light Dragoons in a charge at the battle of Talavera. He served throughout the Peninsular campaign, taking command of the regiment, in the absence of Lord Edward Somerset, at Campo Mayor in March 1811 and Los Santos in April 1811.

In 1805 Dalbiac had married Susanna Isabella, eldest daughter of Lieutenant-colonel John Dalton, of Sleningford Hall, Ripon, Yorkshire. She went out to nurse him when he fell ill with a fever and stayed on by his side, famously at the Battle of Salamanca. In that battle on 22 July 1812 the 4th Light Dragoons, the 5th Dragoon Guards and the 3rd Light Dragoons were under the command of Major-general Le Marchant and took part in a charge in which the general was killed. Susanna went onto the battlefield to help the wounded. After the battle of Salamanca Dalbiac returned with his wife to England and never saw active service again. He was promoted colonel in 1814.

In 1814 Susanna gave birth to her only daughter, Susanna Stephania, and in 1815 the Dalbiacs bought Moulton Hall, near Richmond, North Yorkshire, but when their daughter married James Innes-Ker, 6th Duke of Roxburghe in 1836 they were obliged to sell the house to finance her dowry.

From 1822 to 1824 he was brigadier-general commanding the Goojerat district of the Bombay army and was promoted major-general in 1825 and made a Knight Commander of the Royal Guelphic Order (KCH) by William IV. He was promoted lieutenant-general in 1838 and made colonel of the 3rd Dragoon Guards in 1839. He was transferred to the colonelcy of his old regiment, the 4th Light Dragoons, in September 1842.

He was elected M.P. for Ripon in 1835, sitting until 1837. He died in London in 1847.

Works
Dalbiac wrote a catechism for young and non-commissioned cavalry officers and was a disciple of the writer Izaak Walton. He was also the author of A Few Words on the Corn Laws: Wherein are Brought Under Consideration Certain of the Statements which are to be Found in the Third Edition of Mr. McCulloch's Pamphlet Upon the Same Subject, published in 1841.

Notes

References
 
 

1776 births
1847 deaths
3rd Dragoon Guards officers
4th Queen's Own Hussars officers
People from Hungerford
Members of the Parliament of the United Kingdom for English constituencies
UK MPs 1835–1837
British Army lieutenant generals
Military personnel from Berkshire
British Army personnel of the Peninsular War